Navalur Kuttapattu is a Suburb and Revenue Divisional headquarters of Srirangam taluk in Tiruchirappalli district, Tamil Nadu, India.It is located 12 km to the west of  Tiruchirapalli. 4 km from Manikandam Union. 365 km from State capital Chennai.

Demographics 

As per the 2001 census, Navalur Kuttapattu had a population of 4,943 with 2,481 males and 2,462 females. The sex ratio was 992 and the literacy rate, 70.13. Tamil is the Local Language here.

Educational Institutions in Navalur Kuttapattu 
 St. Vincent Matriculation Higher Secondary School
 Annai Indira Gandhi Memorial Higher Secondary School
 Bharathidasan University Constituent Arts & Science College
 CARE Institute of Technology
 Care International School
 Don Bosco I.T.I, AMSAM
 Government Higher Secondary School
 Horticultural College and Research Institute for Women
 Priest University
 Shivani School of Business Management
 Shivani Institute of Technology
 Tamil Nadu Agricultural university
 Tamil Nadu National Law School

Sub Villages in Navalur Kuttapattu  
 VannanKovil
 Navalur
 Aravangalpatti
 Muthukulam
 Bharathi Nagar
 Anbu Nagar
 Rajeswari Nagar
 Ambedgar Nagar
 Gandhinagar
 Keelakkadu

Church & Temples 

 ADAIKALA MATHA CHURCH
 VINAYAGAR TEMPLE
 ARAVAYEE AMMAN TEMPLE
 KUNNIMARATHAN TEMPLE
 MURUGAN TEMPLE
 NOOR NABIGAL PALLIVAASAL

Political Parties 
 Naam thamizhar Katchi
 ADMK
 DMK
 INC
 AMMK

References 

 

Villages in Tiruchirappalli district